Midsummer Night (Norwegian - Jonsokbål) is an oil on paper painting by the Norwegian artist Nikolai Astrup. It shows the traditional bonfire for Saint John's Eve - sometimes referred to as Midsummer Night - in a valley at Jølster in Norway, the artist's hometown, to which he had returned in 1902. It was begun in 1912 and completed in 1926. It has been in the National Gallery of Norway since 1984.

External links
http://samling.nasjonalmuseet.no/no/object/NG.M.03609
http://digitaltmuseum.no/011042384715?query=nikolai%20astrup&pos=15

Paintings in the collection of the National Gallery (Norway)
1926 paintings
Norwegian paintings